Aberdeen Academy may refer to:

Hazlehead Academy, successor to the former school named "Aberdeen Academy" from 1954 to 1969
List of schools in Aberdeen containing several secondary schools with the suffix Academy in the city of Aberdeen, Scotland
Aberdeen F.C. Reserves and Academy, youth department of the city's professional football club